Bolterdalen is a valley in Nordenskiöld Land at Spitsbergen, Svalbard. It is located south of Adventdalen, and the Bolterelva river flows through the valley.

References

Valleys of Spitsbergen